Virginia "Ginger" Wadsworth is an American writer of biographies, Western American history, science, and natural history for young readers. She is the author of 30 award-winning books.

Early life 

Virginia Leland Evarts was born in San Diego to Dorothea Abbott Evarts, an artist and teacher, and Hal G. Evarts, Jr., an author of many western books, stories for the Saturday Evening Post, biographies, and adventure titles for young readers. Her maternal grandfather, Clinton Gilbert Abbott, was the director of the San Diego Natural History Museum and her paternal grandfather, Hal G. Evarts, was an author of western novels in the 1920s and 1930s.

She and her two younger brothers camped with their family in the Anza-Borrego Desert State Park, explored Baja California, and traveled throughout the Western United States while their father conducted research for his writing. She spent three summers on a ranch and made a six-week bicycle trip from San Diego to Canada with her Girl Scout troop.

Wadsworth graduated from La Jolla High School, and attended the University of California Davis where she graduated with an English degree and minor in Western American History.

Personal life 

In 1967, she married Bill Wadsworth. They have two sons and three grandchildren. Wadsworth and her husband live in the San Francisco East Bay area.

Wadsworth takes her trained therapy dogs into libraries and schools where children (mostly reluctant readers) read to the dogs in Paws to Read programs. She and her dogs are affiliated with Tony La Russa's Animal Rescue Foundation (ARF) and they also visit Alzheimer respite care facilities.

Career 

Wadsworth started writing journals and short stories at a young age. When her children were in elementary school, she began submitting articles to magazines, including Cobblestone (magazine), and had many articles published.  Some of her biographies were expansions of those published articles.

Her first published book was a 1990 biography of Julia Morgan, a California architect and first woman to win the American Institute of Architects' AIA Gold Medal.  John Muir, Rachel Carson, John Burroughs, and Laura Ingalls Wilder were among her early biography subjects. She wrote about Susan Butcher and her dogs who won the Iditarod Trail Sled Dog Race in Alaska four times.  She then wrote a series about animal habitats and another about animal homes. More biographies followed, including ones about Annie Oakley, Benjamin Banneker, Cesar Chavez, and the Wright Brothers. Wadsworth's more recent books include the true story of John Muir and Theodore Roosevelt camping together in Yosemite in 1903, a biography of Juliette Gordon Low the founder of Girl Scouts of the USA, plus two picture books set in Yosemite National Park and a picture book biography of the creator of the Peanuts cartoon strip.

Published books and key awards/honors 

Many of Wadsworth's books have been named to recommended book lists compiled by Social Studies Librarians International, Smithsonian, National Science Teachers Association, Children's Book Council, California Readers, and the Association of Children's Librarians.

Biographies 

Born to Draw Comics, The Story of Charles Schulz and the Creation of Peanuts, illustrated by Craig Orback
First Girl Scout, The Life of Juliette Gordon Low (American Library Association Amelia Bloomer List)
Annie Oakley
Cesar Chavez, illustrated by Mark Schroder
Benjamin Banneker, Pioneering Scientist, illustrated by Craig Orback
The Wright Brothers
Laura Ingalls Wilder, An On My Own Biography, illustrated by Shelley O. Haas
Laura Ingalls Wilder, Storyteller of the Prairie
John Burroughs, the Sage of Slabsides (New York Public Library "Books for the Teenager")
Susan Butcher, Sled Dog Racer
John Muir, Wilderness Protector (John Burroughs Association Riverby Award List for Young Readers)
Rachel Carson, Voice for the Earth
Julia Morgan, Architect of Dreams

Western Americana 

Camping with the President, illustrated by Karen Dugan (National Outdoor Book Award and California Reading Association Eureka Award Honor)
Survival in the Snow, illustrated by Craig Orback
Words West, Voice of Young Pioneers (Western Writers of America Juvenile Nonfiction Spur Award and Colonial Dames of America Young Reader Award)
Along the Santa Fe Trail, illustrated by James Watling

Science and Natural History 

Seasons of the Bear, A Yosemite Story, illustrated by Daniel San Souci (Western Writers of America Storyteller Spur Award)
Yosemite's Songster, One Coyote's Story, illustrated by Daniel San Souci (Western Writers of America Storyteller Spur Award)
Up, Up, and Away, illustrated by Patricia Wynne
Woolly Mammoths, illustrated by Todd Zalewski
River Discoveries, illustrated by Paul Kratter
Tundra Discoveries, illustrated by John Carrozza
Desert Discoveries, illustrated by John Carrozza
One Tiger Growls, illustrated by James Needham
One on a Web, illustrated by James Needham
Giant Sequoia Trees, with photographs by Frank Staub

Fiction/Picture Book 

Tomorrow is Daddy's Birthday, illustrated by Maxie Chambliss

References

External links 

 
 

American children's writers
University of California, Davis alumni
Writers from California
20th-century American women writers
21st-century American women writers
Living people
Year of birth missing (living people)